WNCY-FM (100.3 FM, "Y100") is an American commercial country music formatted radio station licensed to Neenah-Menasha, Wisconsin, that serves the Green Bay and Appleton-Oshkosh areas. WNCY is owned and operated by Midwest Communications, which owns six other radio stations in Northeast Wisconsin. WNCY's studios are located at 1420 Bellevue Street in Bellevue, while its transmitter is located in a rural area east of the city of Kaukauna.

On July 18, 2006, Midwest Communications broke ground on their new, $4.725 million facility in Bellevue, and WNCY moved into the new broadcast center in January 2008. The facility is located on the WNFL tower site on Bellevue Street. WNCY and the six other Midwest Communications stations in Northeast Wisconsin are now located in the new facility.

Current on-air staff
 Charli McKenzie
 Shotgun Shannon
 Dan Stone
 Rachel Chase
 Hannah
 PJ
 Pat Thomas
 Shane Reno
 David Kaye
 Brianne
 Jeff Johnson

History
100.3 was WEMI-FM at 100.1 until it moved to its current frequency of 100.3 on May 18, 1995, and started their country format.

References

External links

Midwest Communications

NCY-FM
Midwest Communications radio stations